The Singles 1971–2006  is a box set compilation of singles by The Rolling Stones spanning the years 1971 to 2006. It covers their output with both Rolling Stones Records and Virgin Records labels.

A sequel of sorts to ABKCO's three boxes of singles replicas from the band's first decade (Singles 1963–1965, Singles 1965–1967, Singles 1968–1971), Universal's The Singles: 1971–2006 is a 45-disc box set consisting of 173 tracks as single replicas of both sleeves and labels for every 45 the Rolling Stones released between Sticky Fingers and A Bigger Bang.

This first edition of the set contained a skip around the four-second mark on the B-side, "I Think I'm Going Mad". The error was fixed in a subsequent edition.

Track listing
All songs by Mick Jagger and Keith Richards, except where noted.

Disc one
"Brown Sugar" – 3:50
"Bitch" – 3:36
"Let It Rock" (Live) (Chuck Berry) – 2:39
Recorded live at Leeds, 13 March 1971

Disc two
"Wild Horses" – 5:43
"Sway" – 3:25

Disc three
"Tumbling Dice" – 3:44
"Sweet Black Angel" – 2:54

Disc four
"Happy" – 3:05
"All Down the Line" – 3:57
Mono single mix

Disc five
"Angie" – 4:33
"Silver Train" – 4:27

Disc six
"Doo Doo Doo Doo Doo (Heartbreaker)" – 3:27
"Dancing with Mr. D" – 4:51

Disc seven
"It's Only Rock 'n Roll (But I Like It)" – 5:09
"Through the Lonely Nights" – 4:12

Disc eight
"Ain't Too Proud to Beg" (Norman Whitfield/Eddie Holland) – 3:30
"Dance Little Sister" – 4:07

Disc nine
"Fool to Cry" – 5:07
"Crazy Mama" – 4:35

Disc ten
"Hot Stuff" – 5:23
"Fool to Cry" – 5:05

Disc eleven
"Miss You" – 3:37
"Far Away Eyes" – 3:46
"Miss You" (12" Version) – 8:35

Disc twelve
"Beast of Burden" – 4:27
"When the Whip Comes Down" – 4:20

Disc thirteen
"Respectable" – 3:10
"When the Whip Comes Down" – 4:21

Disc fourteen
"Shattered" – 3:49
"Everything's Turning to Gold" (Jagger/Richards/Ronnie Wood) – 4:06

Disc fifteen
"Emotional Rescue" – 5:40
"Down in the Hole" – 3:57

Disc sixteen
"She's So Cold" – 4:13
"Send It to Me" – 3:43

Disc seventeen
"Start Me Up" – 3:34
"No Use in Crying" (Jagger/Richards/Wood) – 3:26

Disc eighteen
"Waiting on a Friend" – 4:36
"Little T&A" – 3:21

Disc nineteen
"Hang Fire" – 2:24
"Neighbours" – 3:32

Disc twenty
"Going to a Go-Go" (Live) (William Robinson/Warren Moore/Robert Rogers/Marvin Tarplin) – 3:26
"Beast of Burden" (Live) – 5:03

Disc twenty-one
"Time Is on My Side" (Live) (Norman Meade) – 3:44
"Twenty Flight Rock" (Live) (Eddie Cochran/Ned Fairchild) – 1:47
"Under My Thumb" (Live) – 4:06

Disc twenty-two
"Undercover of the Night" – 4:33
"All the Way Down" – 3:14
"Undercover of the Night" (Dub Version) – 6:24
"Feel On Baby" (Instrumental Dub) – 6:30

Disc twenty-three
"She Was Hot" – 4:44
"I Think I'm Going Mad" – 4:22

Disc twenty-four
"Too Tough" – 3:50
"Miss You" – 3:36

Disc twenty-five
"Harlem Shuffle" (Bob Relf/Ernest Nelson) – 3:26
"Had It with You" (Jagger/Richards/Wood) – 3:20
"Harlem Shuffle" (NY Mix) (Relf/Nelson) – 6:36
"Harlem Shuffle" (London Mix) (Relf/Nelson) – 6:21

Disc twenty-six
"One Hit (To the Body)" (Jagger/Richards/Wood) – 4:10
"Fight" (Jagger/Richards/Wood) – 3:11
"One Hit (To the Body)" (London Mix) (Jagger/Richards/Wood) – 7:02

Disc twenty-seven
"Mixed Emotions" – 4:04
"Fancyman Blues" – 4:55
"Mixed Emotions" (Chris Kimsey's 12") – 6:13
"Tumbling Dice" – 3:44
"Miss You" – 3:37

Disc twenty-eight
"Rock and a Hard Place" – 4:12
"Cook Cook Blues" – 4:12
"Rock and a Hard Place" (Dance Mix) – 6:54
"Rock and a Hard Place" (Oh-Oh Hard Dub Mix) – 6:55
"Rock and a Hard Place" (Michael Brauer Mix) – 7:06
"Rock and a Hard Place" (Bonus Beats Mix) – 4:09
"Emotional Rescue" – 5:36
"Some Girls" – 4:38
"It's Only Rock 'n Roll (But I Like It)" – 5:07
"Rocks Off" – 4:31

Disc twenty-nine
"Almost Hear You Sigh" (Jagger/Richards/Steve Jordan) – 4:37
"Break the Spell" – 3:07
"Wish I'd Never Met You" – 4:44
"Mixed Emotions" – 4:03
"Beast of Burden" – 4:26
"Angie" – 4:32
"Fool to Cry" – 5:05
"Miss You" – 3:36
"Waiting on a Friend" – 4:35

Disc thirty
"Terrifying" (7" Remix) – 4:11
"Rock and a Hard Place" (7" Version) – 4:10
"Terrifying" (12" Remix) – 6:56
"Rock and a Hard Place" (Dance Mix) – 6:54
"Harlem Shuffle" (London Mix) (Relf/Nelson) – 6:21
"Wish I'd Never Met You" – 4:42
"Harlem Shuffle" (LP Version) (Relf/Nelson) – 3:24

Disc thirty-one
"Highwire" – 3:47
"2000 Light Years from Home" (Live) – 3:29
"Highwire" (Full Length Version) – 4:44
"Sympathy for the Devil" (Live) – 5:24
"I Just Want to Make Love to You" (Live) (Willie Dixon) – 4:03
"Play with Fire" (Live) (Nanker Phelge) – 3:30
"Factory Girl" (Live) – 2:35
Tracks 2 & 4–7 recorded during Steel Wheels/Urban Jungle 1989–90 World Tour

Disc thirty-two
"Ruby Tuesday" (Live) – 4:13
"Play with Fire" (Live) (Phelge) – 3:21
"You Can't Always Get What You Want" (Live) – 7:06
"Undercover of the Night" (Live) – 4:11
"Rock and a Hard Place" (Live) – 5:13
"Harlem Shuffle" (Live) (Relf/Nelson) – 4:04
"Winning Ugly VI" (London Mix) – 7:53

Disc thirty-three
"Sexdrive" (Single Edit) – 4:29
"Undercover of the Night" (Live) – 4:17

Disc thirty-four
"Love Is Strong" (Album Version) – 3:38
"The Storm" – 2:45
"So Young" – 3:22
"Love Is Strong" (Bob Clearmountain Remix) – 3:49
"Love Is Strong" (Teddy Riley Radio Remix) – 4:07
"Love Is Strong" (Teddy Riley Extended Remix) – 5:05
"Love Is Strong" (Teddy Riley Extended Rock Remix) – 4:48
"Love Is Strong" (Teddy Riley Dub Remix) – 4:06
"Love Is Strong" (Joe The Butcher Club Mix) – 5:24
"Love Is Strong" (Teddy Riley Instrumental) – 4:46

Disc thirty-five
"You Got Me Rocking" – 3:36
"Jump on Top of Me" – 4:23
"You Got Me Rocking" (Perfecto Mix) – 5:02
"You Got Me Rocking" (Sexy Disco Dub Mix) – 6:16
"You Got Me Rocking" (Trance Mix) – 4:59

Disc thirty-six
"Out of Tears" (Don Was Edit) – 4:22
"I'm Gonna Drive" – 3:42
"Out of Tears" (Bob Clearmountain Remix Edit) – 4:21
"So Young" – 3:22
"Sparks Will Fly" (Radio Clean Version) – 3:15

Disc thirty-seven
"I Go Wild" (LP Version) – 4:21
"I Go Wild" (Scott Litt Remix) – 4:35
"I Go Wild" (Live) – 6:30
Recorded in Miami, Florida, on 25 November 1994
"I Go Wild" (Luis Resto Straight Vocal Mix) – 5:40

Disc thirty-eight
"Like a Rolling Stone" (Live) (Album Version) (Bob Dylan) – 5:38
Recorded in London on 19 July 1995
"Black Limousine" (Live) (Jagger/Richards/Wood) – 3:28
"All Down the Line" (Live) – 4:24
"Like a Rolling Stone" (Live) (Edit) (Dylan) – 4:20

Disc thirty-nine
"Anybody Seen My Baby?" (LP Edit) (Jagger/Richards/k.d. lang/Ben Mink) – 4:08
"Anybody Seen My Baby?" (Soul Solution Remix Edit) (Jagger/Richards/lang/Mink) – 4:24
"Anybody Seen My Baby?" (Armand's Rolling Steelo Mix) (Jagger/Richards/lang/Mink) – 10:28
"Anybody Seen My Baby?" (Soul Solution Remix) (Jagger/Richards/lang/Mink) – 9:29
"Anybody Seen My Baby?" (Bonus Roll) (Jagger/Richards/lang/Mink) – 5:58
"Anybody Seen My Baby?" (Album Version) (Jagger/Richards/lang/Mink) – 4:32

Disc forty
"Saint of Me" (Radio Edit) – 4:11
"Anyway You Look at It" – 4:20
"Gimme Shelter" (Voodoo Lounge Tour) – 6:53 (Mistakingly credited as recorded on the Live Licks Tour on the sleeve)
"Saint of Me" (Deep Dish Grunge Garage Remix Parts 1 & 2) – 13:34
"Saint of Me" (Deep Dish Grunge Garage Dub) – 7:25
"Saint of Me" (Deep Dish Rolling Dub) – 7:17
"Anybody Seen My Baby?" (Bonus Roll) (Jagger/Richards/lang/Mink) – 6:01
"Anybody Seen My Baby?" (Phil Jones Remix) (Jagger/Richards/lang/Mink) – 4:26
"Saint of Me" (Deep Dish Club Mix) – 7:30
"Saint of Me" (Deep Dish Grunge Dub) – 7:23
"Saint of Me" (Todd Terry Extended Remix) – 5:57

Disc forty-one
"Out of Control" (Album Radio Edit) – 3:48
"Out of Control" (In Hand with Fluke Radio Edit) – 4:33
"Out of Control" (Bi-Polar at the Controls) – 5:12
"Out of Control" (Bi-Polar Outer Version) – 5:11
"Out of Control" (In Hand with Fluke Instrumental) – 5:54
"Out of Control" (In Hand with Fluke Full Version) – 8:27
"Out of Control" (Bi-Polar's Fat Controller Mix) – 5:24
"Out of Control" (Saber Final Mix) – 5:44

Disc forty-two
"Don't Stop" (Edit) – 3:31
Mixed by Bob Clearmountain
"Don't Stop" (New Rock Mix) – 4:02
Mixed by Jack Joseph Puig
"Miss You" (Remix) – 8:34
Mixed by Bob Clearmountain

Disc forty-three
"Streets of Love" – 5:10
"Rough Justice" – 3:11

Disc forty-four
"Rain Fall Down" (will.i.am Remix) – 4:06
"Rain Fall Down" (Radio Edit) – 4:02
"Rain Fall Down" (Ashley Beedle's 'Heavy Disco' Radio Edit) – 4:04
"Rain Fall Down" (Ashley Beedle's 'Heavy Disco' Vocal Re-Edit) – 6:10

Disc forty-five
"Biggest Mistake" – 4:07
"Dance (Pt. 1)" (Live) (Jagger/Richards/Wood) – 6:02
"Before They Make Me Run" (Live) – 3:56
"Hand of Fate" (Live) – 4:03
Tracks 2–4 recorded at the Olympic Theatre, Paris, 2003

References

Albums produced by the Glimmer Twins
The Rolling Stones compilation albums
2011 compilation albums
B-side compilation albums